"Madrigal", Op. 35 is a four-part song by Gabriel Fauré to words by Armand Silvestre, composed in 1883. It is written to be sung by vocal quartet or choir, with piano or – a later addition – an orchestral accompaniment. The song was reused in 1919 in the composer's Masques et bergamasques.

Composition

Fauré had a liking for Silvestre's poems, and set several of them. This one, titled "Pour un chœur alterné" by the author, is from Silvestre's 1878 collection, La chanson des heures. With its theme of young men and women accusing each other of selfishness and cruelty in affairs of the heart, Fauré set it as a mischievous wedding present for his friend and ex-pupil André Messager, who was the dedicatee. The pianist and scholar Graham Johnson comments that the song has "the wittiness and suggestiveness of a speech by the best man at a wedding." The opening line of the music quotes a theme by J. S. Bach which may have had some private significance for the two friends.

The song was first performed at a concert of the Société Nationale de Musique on 12 January 1884 by the société's choir. It was published by Hamelle in the same year. The premiere of the orchestral version was given by solo quartet and the société's orchestra on 30 April 1892. Fauré later incorporated the song in its orchestral form into his incidental music to Masques et bergamasques (1919).

Text

Notes, references and sources

Notes

References

Sources
 
 
 

Compositions by Gabriel Fauré
1883 compositions